Jukka Samuli Yrjänheikki (born 23 September 1988) is a Finnish football player currently playing for Rovaniemen Palloseura.

Career
Jukka made his first professional contract for Rovaniemen Palloseura in 2006. In 2006 and 2007 he also played for FC Lynx in the Finnish second division. He played in 2009 for Rovaniemen Palloseura in eight games in the Veikkausliiga, before signing for PS Kemi Kings.

In 2010 and 2011 he played for PS Kemi Kings in the Finnish first division. 
He signed a one-year contract for RoPS in March 2012 and won Champion of Finnish first division. In 2014 Yrjänheikki was captain of FC Santa Claus and they promoted to Finnish second division, Kakkonen.

References

1988 births
Living people
Finnish footballers
Rovaniemen Palloseura players
FC Santa Claus players
Association football defenders
People from Rovaniemi
Sportspeople from Lapland (Finland)